Allium vineale (wild garlic, onion grass, crow garlic or stag's garlic) is a perennial, bulb-forming species of wild onion, native to Europe, northwestern Africa and the Middle East. The species was introduced in Australia and North America, where it has become a noxious weed.

Description 
All parts of the plant have a strong garlic odour. The underground bulb is 1–2 cm diameter, with a fibrous outer layer. The main stem grows to 30–120 cm tall, bearing 2–4 leaves and an apical inflorescence 2–5 cm diameter comprising a number of small bulbils and none to a few flowers, subtended by a basal bract. The leaves are slender hollow tubes, 15–60 cm long and 2–4 mm thick, waxy texture, with a groove along the side of the leaf facing the stem. The inflorescence is a tight umbel surrounded by a membranous bract in bud which withers when the flowers open. There are six tepals, six stamens and a pistil formed from three fused carpels. Mixed with the flowers are several yellowish-brown bulbils. The fruit is a capsule but the seeds seldom set and propagation usually takes place when the bulbils are knocked off and grow into new plants. Plants with no flowers, only bulbils, are sometimes distinguished as the variety Allium vineale var. compactum, but this character is probably not taxonomically significant.

Uses and problems 
 While Allium vineale has been suggested as a substitute for garlic, there is some difference of opinion as to whether there is an unpleasant aftertaste compared to that of common garlic (Allium sativum). It imparts a garlic-like flavour and odour on dairy and beef products when grazed by livestock. It is considered a pestilential invasive weed in the US, as grain products may become tainted with a garlic odour or flavour in the presence of aerial bulblets at the time of harvest.  Wild garlic is tolerant to herbicides, which cannot cling well to the vertical, smooth and waxy structure of its leaves.

Allium vineale 'Hair', a cultivated version is sold as an ornamental plant in the UK and USA, due to the unusual flowerheads which have purple centres and have green hair-like extensions.

See also 

 Allium
 Allium oleraceum
 List of beneficial weeds

References

External links 
 Richens, R.H. 1947. Biological flora of the British Isles: Allium vineale L. Journal of Ecology 34, 209-226.
 Jepson Manual Treatment
 USDA Plants Profile
 Virginia Tech Weed Guide
 
 

vineale
Flora of Europe
Flora of North Africa
Taxa named by Carl Linnaeus